Lycomorphoides simulans is a species of beetle in the family Cerambycidae, the only species in the genus Lycomorphoides.

References

Lepturinae